This article is a compendium of hand-operable air-line fittings, typically of quick-disconnect type, used for pneumatics and other compressed air purposes including breathable air (a subset of breathing gases).

Breathable air applications
For breathable air applications such as SCBA, these may found on both sides of the first-stage and second-stage pressure regulators (very similar to SCUBA diving regulators) to allow for rapid and tool-free return-to-service. For breathable air applications such as supplied-air and mixed supplied-air with SCBA backup, the quick-disconnect fittings allow movement of a worker from one supplied-air station to another.

Other applications
These fittings or special-service variants may also be found in hydraulic applications and alternative compressed gas applications (Oxy-acetylene welding and cutting, fuel gases, NSF C-2 food-contact, etc...), though perhaps not as frequently.

Summary tables of fittings, alpha-sorted by common fitting name

Table 1
In many instances the name is the manufacturer who originated or popularized a particular design.

(see also: ARO, Automotive, Broomwade InstantAir, Camel, Coilhose, Tru-Flate, Walther, etc...)

Table 2

Summary table of cross-compatible "meta" fitting designs, specifications, or profiles, alpha-sorted by common fitting name.

(see also: British Profile, English Industrial profile, Italian Profile, Japanese Profile, 7.2 - 7.4 European Profile, ISO 6150-C)

Table 3
Table 3 should be incorporated into the other tables above

References 

 Mine Safety Appliances Corporation, Pittsburgh, Pennsylvania MSA North America catalog, Air Line Respirators section undated (last fetched 2009-03-08)

Pneumatics